The Mazda CX-60 is a mid-size crossover SUV produced by the Japanese automobile manufacturer Mazda since 2022. It is the first vehicle to use Mazda's rear- and all-wheel drive Skyactiv Multi-Solution Scalable Architecture with longitudinal engine layout, which includes a line-up of straight-six engines. It is also the first Mazda vehicle to feature a plug-in hybrid option.

The CX-60 is marketed in Europe, Japan, Australia and several other markets, while the North American market will receive the wider CX-70. By size, it is larger than the CX-5 and smaller than the CX-9. It is comparable in size to the CX-50, and wider but shorter in length than the CX-8.

Overview 
The CX-60 was revealed on 8 March 2022 as part of Mazda's newly established "Large Product Group", which includes a range of larger vehicles using rear- and all-wheel drive layout. Due to the switch to the rear-wheel drive-based layout, the model is moved upmarket towards models from luxury brands.

The model is a two-row vehicle which uses rear-biased, full-time all-wheel drive marketed as "i-Activ AWD". It also features Kinematic Posture Control system which applies the brakes to the inside rear wheel to contain body roll.

Powertrain 
The petrol plug-in hybrid (PHEV) model was the first variant to be released.

Other engine options include two newly-developed units, which are 3.3-litre e-Skyactiv D diesel and 3.0-litre e-Skyactiv X petrol with spark-compression-ignition technology, both inline six-cylinder units with 48V mild hybrid system and will be released in late 2022 and 2023 respectively. In October 2022, a 3.3-litre Skyactiv-G turbocharged petrol engine was announced for some markets such as Australia, producing .

Every CX-60 is equipped with an 8-speed automatic gearbox with a multi-plate clutch and integrated electric motor/generator which replaces hydraulic converter as an input clutch in order to preserve the cornering performance of a rear-wheel drive system.

References

External links 

  (UK)

CX-60
Cars introduced in 2022
Mid-size sport utility vehicles
Crossover sport utility vehicles
Rear-wheel-drive vehicles
All-wheel-drive vehicles
Hybrid sport utility vehicles
Partial zero-emissions vehicles
Plug-in hybrid vehicles
Cars powered by longitudinal 4-cylinder engines